NH 97 may refer to:

 National Highway 97 (India)
 New Hampshire Route 97, United States